Work in progress or work in process is the general description of a partially finished project.

Work in Progress may also refer to:

Literature
 Work in Progress (book), by Michael Eisner
 A Work in Progress (book), 2015 memoir by YouTuber Connor Franta 
 Work in Progress, the name under which the first installments of Finnegans Wake by James Joyce were originally published
 Work in Progress, the early draft of a book by Cliff Holden (1999), manuscript copy was added to the Tate Gallery archive in 2004

Film
 A Work in Progress (film), Neil Peart's documentary film of the recording of Rush's Test for Echo album
 Work in Progress (1951 film), a British short documentary
 Work in Progress (2000 film), a computer-animated short film

Television
 Work in Progress (TV series), an American comedy series broadcast from 2019

Music
 Works in Progress (Kansas album), 2006
 Works in Progress (Tim Buckley album), 1999 
 Work in Progress, an album by U.K. Subs
 Work in Progress, an album by Jeff & Sheri Easter
 Work in Progress (album), a 2002 album by Man Alive
 Work in Progress, an album by Edgar Meyer
 Work in Progress, an EP included in Robert Wyatt album Mid-Eighties
 A Work in Progress, a 2003 album by Myka 9
 "Work in Progress" (song), by Alan Jackson

Other
 Joe Frank: Work in Progress, a radio program by Joe Frank broadcast from 1986 through 2002